Eighteen: The World at My Feet is a 2010 Italian drama film directed by Elisabetta Rocchetti.

The film premiered at the Terra di Siena Film Festival on 2 October 2010 and was theatrically released on 29 April 2011.

Cast
Marco Rulli as Ludovico
Rosa Pianeta as Luisa
Alessia Barela as Silvia
G-Max as Luciano
Nina Torresi as Martina
Elisabetta Rocchetti as Giulia
Monica Cervini as Debora
Marco Iannitello as Luca

References

External links

2010 films
2010s Italian-language films
2010 drama films
Italian drama films
Films directed by Elisabetta Rocchetti
2010s Italian films